The Averch–Johnson effect is the tendency of regulated companies to engage in excessive amounts of capital accumulation in order to expand the volume of their profits. If companies' profits to capital ratio is regulated at a certain percentage then there is a strong incentive for companies to over-invest in order to increase profits overall. This investment goes beyond any optimal efficiency point for capital that the company may have calculated as higher profit is almost always desired over and above efficiency.

Excessive capital accumulation under rate-of-return regulation is informally known as gold plating.

But the so-called Averch-Johnson effect of overcapitalization does not as a general case involve "gold-plating".

Mathematical derivation 
The firm's profit is constrained such that:where  is the allowable rate of return. Assume that . We may then form a functional to find the firm's optimal action:where  is the Lagrange multiplier (also known as the shadow price). The derivatives of this functional are:Taken together, this implies that:The ratio of the marginal product of capital and the marginal product of labor is:Since this new cost of capital is perceived to be less than the market cost of capital, the firm will tend to overinvest in capital.

See also
Law and economics
Public utilities commission
Rate-of-return regulation

References

Further reading 

 Greer, Monica (2012). Electricity Marginal Cost Pricing: Applications in Eliciting Demand Responses. Waltham, MA: Butterworth-Heinemann.
 Lesser, Jonathan A.; Giacchino, Leonardo R. (2013). Fundamentals of Energy Regulation (2nd ed.). Public Utilities Reports, Inc.
 Willis, H. Lee; Philipson, Lorrin (2019). Understanding Electric Utilities and De-Regulation. Power Engineering. Boca Raton, FL: CRC Press.

External links

 Body of Knowledge on Infrastructure Regulation: Incentive Features and Other Properties
 The Averch Johnson Effect

Economics of regulation
Law and economics
Mathematical economics
Public utilities